The Wedding is a 2003 romantic novel by Nicholas Sparks. It is about a couple who celebrate 30 years' marriage, and has been described as a sequel to Sparks's previous novel The Notebook.
The book follows the life of Noah and Allie's daughter, Jane and her husband, Wilson. While they are planning their daughter's wedding, Wilson decides he needs to "re-court" his wife to save their marriage.

References

2003 American novels
American romance novels